John Walbran may refer to:
 John Thomas Walbran, English-Canadian ship's master and writer
 John Richard Walbran, British antiquarian